Mate Pavić and Michael Venus were the defending champions, but Venus chose to compete in Delray Beach instead. Pavić played alongside Alexander Peya, but lost in the quarterfinals to Robin Haase and Dominic Inglot.

Julien Benneteau and Nicolas Mahut won the title, defeating Haase and Inglot in the final, 6–4, 6–7(9–11), [10–5].

Seeds

Draw

Draw

References
 Main draw

Open 13 Provence - Doubles
2017 Doubles